The Mashco-Piro or Mascho Piro, also known as the Cujareño people and Nomole, are an indigenous tribe of nomadic hunter-gatherers who inhabit the remote regions of the Amazon rainforest. They live in Manú National Park in the Madre de Dios Region in Peru. They have in the past actively avoided contact with non-native peoples.

Demographics 

In 1998, the IWGIA estimated their number to be around 100 to 250. This is an increase from the 1976 estimated population of 20 to 100.

The Mashco-Piro tribe speaks a dialect of the Piro language. "Mashco" (originally spelled "Maschcos") is a term which was first used by Padre Biedma in 1687 to refer to the Harakmbut people. It is considered a derogatory term, due to its meaning of "savages" in the Piro language; "Nomole" is the name the people apply to themselves.

History 

In 1894, most of the Mashco-Piro tribe was slaughtered by the private army of Carlos Fitzcarrald, in the upper Manú River area. The survivors retreated to the remote forest areas. The sightings of the Mashco-Piro tribe members increased in the 21st century. According to the anthropologist Glenn Shepard, who had an encounter with the Mashco-Piro in 1999, the increased sightings of the tribe could be due to illegal logging in the area and low-flying aircraft associated with oil and gas exploration.

In September 2007, a group of ecologists filmed about 20 members of the Mashco-Piro tribe from a helicopter flying above the Alto Purús national park. The group had established camp on the banks of the Las Piedras river near the Peruvian and Brazilian border. Scientists believe that the tribe prefers to construct palm-leaf huts on riverbanks during the dry season for fishing. During the wet season, they retreat to the rain forest. Similar huts were spotted in the 1980s.

In October 2011, the Peru Ministry of Environment released a video of a few Mashco-Piros, taken by some travelers. Gabriella Galli, an Italian visitor to the park, also captured a photograph of the tribe members.

In 2012, Survival International released some new photographs of the tribe members. The archaeologist Diego Cortijo of the Spanish Geographical Society claimed to have captured photographs of a Mashco-Piro family from the Manú National Park, while on an expedition along the Madre de Dios River in search of petroglyphs. However, this claim to the photograph was subsequently disputed by Jean-Paul Van Belle who claimed to have taken these pictures 3 weeks earlier. His local guide Nicolas "Shaco" Flores, who was found dead six days later with a bamboo-tipped arrow stuck in his heart, is believed to have been killed by members of the Mashco-Piro tribe.

In August 2013, the BBC reported that a group of Mashco-Piros had been seen apparently asking neighboring villagers for food. The Peruvian government has banned contact with the Mashco-Piros for fear that they might be infected by strangers with diseases to which the Mashco-Piros have not built up immunity.

See also 
 Uncontacted peoples

References

External links 
 "Rare glimpse of isolated Peruvian tribe", BBC News
"Rare video of long isolated Peru tribe of Mashco-Piro Indians released." The Telegraph. August 20, 2013.
 Last isolated tribes NY Times, August 8, 2015

Uncontacted peoples
Hunter-gatherers of South America
Indigenous peoples in Peru
Indigenous peoples of the Amazon